William VIII may refer to:

 William VIII, Duke of Aquitaine (1025–1086)
 William VIII of Montpellier (died 1202)
 William VIII of Jülich, Count of Ravensberg (c. 1380 – 1428)
 William VIII, Marquis of Montferrat (1420–1483)
 William VIII, Landgrave of Hesse-Kassel (1682–1760)